Demandware is a software technology company headquartered in Burlington, Massachusetts that provides a cloud-based unified e-commerce platform with mobile, AI personalization, order management capabilities, and related services for B2C and B2B retailers and brand manufacturers around the world.

Founded in 2004, Demandware was acquired by Salesforce in 2016 for $2.8B. The company was subsequently renamed Salesforce Commerce Cloud.

History

Pre-IPO (2004–12) 
Demandware was founded in February 2004 by Stephan Schambach to provide a hosted service that would enable companies to develop and manage easy-to-use, customizable e-commerce websites, rather than building a site from scratch. The service was launched in the first quarter of 2005. Schambach previously founded the early e-commerce company Intershop in 1992. Seed money for Demandware was provided by venture capital firms General Catalyst Partners and North Bridge Venture Partners.

Post-IPO (2012–present) 
On March 15, 2012, Demandware began trading on the New York Stock Exchange, raising $88 million in its initial public offering of $16 per share. Following its IPO, shares were up more than 50% from the IPO price by the next morning. In November 2013, Demandware announced an underwritten registered public offering.

Locations 
Demandware is headquartered in Burlington, Massachusetts. The company also has offices in Salt Lake City, Utah; Deerfield Beach, Florida; the United Kingdom; France; Denmark; Germany; the Netherlands; Australia; Hong Kong; China; and Japan.

Rankings 
 After a three-year growth in revenue of 657% from 2008 to 2011, Demandware was ranked #563 on Inc. magazine's Inc. 5000 list in 2012.

References

External links 
 Demandware (English) website

Salesforce
Companies formerly listed on the New York Stock Exchange
Providers of services to on-line companies
American companies established in 2004
Software companies established in 2004
2004 establishments in Massachusetts
2012 initial public offerings
Software companies based in Massachusetts
Technology companies based in the Boston area
Companies based in Burlington, Massachusetts
Cloud computing providers
2016 mergers and acquisitions
Software companies of the United States